This List presents a comprehensive source of references for statistical guidance documents and related articles that are relevant to regulatory affairs for those statisticians that work on clinical studies.  The List is associated with the Wikipedia page Guidances for statistics in regulatory affairs that aims to address the various topics of the listed guidances. Regulatory guidances (draft and/or final ) are subject to revisions. Therefore, users of the guidances are advised to consult the original website to check for the latest version. Users are also encouraged to update the Wikipedia List.

References classified by statistical topic

Good clinical practice 
ICH E6(R2): Good clinical practice  is an international ethical and scientific quality standard for designing, conducting, recording and reporting trials that involve the participation of human subjects.  
 FDA: Good Review Practice: Clinical Review of Investigational New Drug Applications. This good review practice (GRP) document was prepared to assist FDA clinical review staff in reviewing clinical submissions to an investigational new drug application (IND) from the pre-IND phase to the time of the pre-new drug application/biologics license application meeting.

Data monitoring committees 
CHMP/EWP/5872/03: Data monitoring committees (EMA) deals with independent data monitoring committees. It highlights the key issues involved when sponsors include data monitoring committees as a part of their trial management.
 FDA: Establishment and Operation of Clinical Trial Data Monitoring Committees. This guidance discusses the roles, responsibilities and operating procedures of Data Monitoring Committees (DMCs) (also known as Data and Safety Monitoring Boards (DSMBs) or Data and Safety Monitoring Committees (DSMCs)) that may carry out important aspects of clinical trial monitoring.

Adjustment by covariates 
EMA/CHMP/295050/2013: Adjustment for baseline covariates in clinical trials (EMA) provides advice on how to address important baseline covariates in designing, analysing and reporting clinical trials. It mainly focuses on confirmatory randomised trials.

Small populations / rare diseases
 CHMP/EWP/83561/05: Clinical trials in small populations (EMA) addresses problems associated with clinical trials when there are limited numbers of patients available to study.
 FDA Rare diseases: Common issues in drug development. Guidance for industry.
 see also the subgroup analysis section

Extrapolation / bridging
 EMA/199678/2016: Reflection paper on extrapolation of efficacy and safety in paediatric medicine development.
 EMA/189724/2018: Reflection paper on the use of extrapolation in the development of medicines for paediatrics.
 EMA/129698/2012: Concept paper on extrapolation of efficacy and safety in medicine development.
 FDA-2015-D-1376: Leveraging existing clinical data for extrapolation to pediatric uses of medical devices. Guidance for Industry and Food and Drug Administration Staff.
 ICH E5 (R1): Ethnic factors in the acceptability of foreign clinical data. This document addresses the intrinsic characteristics of the drug recipient and extrinsic characteristics associated with environment and culture that could affect the results of clinical studies carried out in regions and describes the concept of the "bridging study" that a new region may request to determine whether data from another region are applicable to its population.
 FDA-2016-D-2153: Use of real-world evidence to support regulatory decision-making for medical devices. Guidance for Industry and FDA Staff.

Non-inferiority 
CPMP/EWP/2158/99: Choice of a non-inferiority (EMA) provides guidance on two types of non-inferiority trials: trials with two arms, the test product and a comparator; and three-armed trials with the test product, an active comparator and placebo.
CPMP/EWP/482/99: Switching between superiority and non-inferiority (EMA) addresses the issues of superiority, non-inferiority and equivalence from the perspective of an efficacy trial with a single primary variable.

Subgroup analysis 
 EMA/CHMP/539146/2013: Investigation of subgroups in confirmatory clinical trials (EMA) provides guidance for assessors in European regulatory agencies on assessment of subgroup analyses in confirmatory clinical trials.
 see also the Small populations / rare diseases section

Endpoints
 FDA: Clinical trial endpoints for the approval of cancer drugs and biologics provides recommendations to applicants on endpoints for cancer clinical trials submitted to the Food and Drug Administration (FDA) to support effectiveness claims in new drug applications (NDAs), biologics license applications (BLAs), or supplemental applications.

Marketing authorization
CPMP/EWP/2330/99: Application with 1. Meta-analyses; 2. One pivotal study (EMA) provides guidance on two topics: the use of meta-analysis and the use of only a single pivotal study in phase III clinical development.
ICH E1: Population exposure: the extent of population exposure to assess clinical safety presents an accepted set of principles for the safety evaluation of drugs intended for the long-term treatment (chronic or repeated intermittent use for longer than 6 months) of non-life-threatening diseases.
EMA/129698/2012: Extrapolation of efficacy and safety in medicine development (EMA) discusses the need and possibility to develop a framework for extrapolation approaches that are considered scientifically valid and reliable to support medicine authorisation.

Missing data
CPMP/EWP/1776/99: Missing data in confirmatory clinical trials (EMA) explains how the presence of missing data in confirmatory clinical trials should be addressed and reported in a dossier submitted for regulatory review. It provides an insight into the regulatory standards that will be used to assess confirmatory clinical trials with missing data.

Multiplicity
EMA/286914/2012: Multiplicity issues in clinical trials (EMA) addresses the multiplicity in the clinical trials in the context of an application for marketing authorisation of a medicinal product.

FDA-2016-D-4460: Multiple Endpoints in Clinical Trials. Guidance for Industry. This guidance provides sponsors and review staff with the Agency’s thinking about the problems posed by multiple endpoints in the analysis and interpretation of study results and how these problems can be managed in clinical trials for human drugs, including drugs subject to licensing as biological products.

Randomization 
The randomization is discussed in:
FDA: Good Review Practice: Clinical Review of Investigational New Drug Applications, chapter 6.

Reporting 
ICH E3: Structure and content of clinical study reports aims to allow the compilation of a single core clinical study report acceptable to all regulatory authorities of the ICH regions. Read together with questions and answers.
FDA: Safety Reporting Requirements for INDs and BA/BE Studies. This guidance focuses on expedited safety reporting requirements for human drug and biological products that are being investigated under an IND and for drugs that are the subjects of bioavailability (BA) and bioequivalence (BE) studies that are exempt from the IND requirements.
FDA: Adverse Event Reporting to IRBs. This guidance focuses guidance provides recommendations for sponsors and investigators conducting IND trials to help them differentiate between those adverse events that are unanticipated problems that must be reported to an IRB and those that are not.
FDA: Postmarketing Safety Reporting for Human Drug and Biological Products Including Vaccines. This guidance is intended to assist applicants and other responsible parties in fulfilling the FDAs existing postmarketing safety reporting requirements for human marketed drug and biological products.
ICH E2F: Development Safety Update Report. (DSUR) is intended to be a common standard for periodic reporting on drugs under development (including marketed drugs that are under further study) among the ICH regions.

Study design 
ICH E4: Dose response information to support drug registration provides guidance on obtaining dose-response information. It describes the study designs for assessing dose-response.
ICH E5 (R1): Ethnic factors in the acceptability of foreign clinical data recommends a framework for evaluating the impact of ethnic factors upon a medicine’s effect, i.e., its efficacy and safety at a particular dosage and dose regimen. Read together with questions and answers.
ICH E9: Statistical principles for clinical trials section III provides a general overview of common  designs in clinical trials. 
ICH E10: Choice of control group in clinical trials describes the general principles involved in choosing a control group for clinical trials intended to demonstrate the efficacy of a treatment and to discuss related trial design and conduct issues.
CHMP/EWP/2459/02: Methodological issues in confirmatory clinical trials planned with an adaptive design (EMA) focuses on the opportunities for interim trial design modifications, and the prerequisites, problems and pitfalls that must be considered as soon as any kind of flexibility is introduced into a confirmatory  clinical trial intended to provide evidence of efficacy.
FDA: Adaptive Design Clinical Trials for Drugs and Biologics. This guidance focuses on information regarding adaptive design clinical trials when used in drug development programs.

Method validation
EMEA/CHMP/EWP/192217/2009: EMA Guideline on bioanalytical method validation. This guideline defines key elements necessary for the validation of bioanalytical methods.

Data quality standards
FDA: Guidance for Sponsors, Clinical Investigators, and IRBs Data Retention When Subjects Withdraw from FDA Regulated Clinical Trials. This guidance describes the FDA policy that already-accrued data, relating to individuals who cease participating in a study, are to be maintained as part of the study data. This pertains to data from individuals who decide to discontinue participation in a study, who are withdrawn by their legally authorized representative, as applicable, or who are discontinued from participation by the clinical investigator.

References classified by special populations

Gender
 FDA: Evaluation of Sex-Specific Data in Medical Device Clinical Studies  provides guidance on the study and evaluation of sex-specific data in medical device clinical studies.

Geriatrics
 ICH E7: Studies in support of special populations: geriatrics  addresses the clinical evaluation of medicinal products in geriatric populations. It gives special consideration to the differences in pharmacokinetic, pharmacodynamic and dose response studies in elderly patients. It also covers drug drug interaction studies.

References classified by therapeutic area

Chronic obstructive pulmonary disease (COPD)
 EMA/CHMP/483572/2012 Guideline on clinical investigation of medicinal products in the treatment of chronic obstructive pulmonary disease (COPD)

Diabetes mellitus 
 FDA: Evaluating Cardiovascular Risk in New Antidiabetic Therapies to Treat Type 2 Diabetes provides recommendations for the development of drugs and therapeutic biologics regulated within the Center for Drug Evaluation and Research at the Food and Drug Administration (FDA) for the treatment of diabetes mellitus. Specifically, this guidance makes recommendations about how to demonstrate that a new antidiabetic therapy to treat type 2 diabetes is not associated with an unacceptable increase in cardiovascular risk.

Multiple sclerosis (MS)
 EMA/CHMP/771815/2011, Rev 2 Guideline on clinical investigation of medicinal products for the treatment of multiple sclerosis

Oncology 
 FDA: Clinical trial endpoints for the approval of cancer drugs and biologics provides recommendations to applicants on endpoints for cancer clinical trials submitted to the Food and Drug Administration (FDA) to support effectiveness claims in new drug applications (NDAs), biologics license applications (BLAs), or supplemental applications.

References classified as Health Technology Assessment (HTA)

EUnetHTA guidelines
The European Network for Health Technology Assessment (EUnetHTA) supports collaboration between several European HTA organizations. EUnetHTA Guidelines have been developed to help the assessors of evidence to process, analyse and interpret the data.

 EUnetHTA: Endpoints used for Relative Effectiveness Assessment Clinical Endpoints. This guideline provides a set of recommendations for the selection and assessment of clinical endpoints when completing a Relative Effectiveness Assessment (REA).
 EUnetHTA: Endpoints used for Relative Effectiveness Assessment Composite endpoints. This guideline provides a set of recommendations and aspects to be considered for the assessment and interpretation of results of composite endpoints while performing relative effectiveness assessments.
 EUnetHTA: Endpoints used in Relative Effectiveness Assessment Surrogate Endpoints. This guideline is intended to provide guidance on when and how surrogate endpoints can be used for Relative Effectiveness Assessment (REA). The guideline is not intended to give a comprehensive list of validated surrogate endpoints and how well they predict final clinical endpoints.
 EUnetHTA: Endpoints used in Relative Effectiveness Assessment Safety. This guideline aims at providing a framework for the evaluation of relative safety performed by HTA assessors in the context of Relative Effectiveness Assessment (REA) .
 EUnetHTA: Endpoints used for Relative Effectiveness Assessment Health related quality of life and utility measures. This guideline encompasses “health-related quality of life” (HRQoL) measures used for assessing HRQoL as one of the patient-reported outcomes of an intervention targeting morbidity reduction as well as HRQoL measures used in combination with life expectancy. As such, it relates mainly to the use of HRQoL measures in clinical trials. The perspective taken is that of the assessor of the relative effectiveness of an intervention in the context of a reimbursement request. 
 EUnetHTA: Comparators & Comparisons Criteria for the choice of the most appropriate comparator(s). This guideline is intended to summarise the available literature, the advice provided by existing national guidelines and the information from current national practice on the choice of comparator, and to outline some of the challenges arising when establishing what the comparator for a specific assessment should be.  It provides a set of internationally agreeable best practice recommendations for the selection of the most appropriate comparator when completing a REA. 
 EUnetHTA: Comparators & Comparisons Direct and indirect comparisons. This guideline is intended to describe the main methods of direct, indirect and mixed treatment comparison available in terms of the types of relationship they can model and the assumptions inherent in them. The guideline is not intended to give a detailed understanding of the meta-analytic techniques described, but rather to explain the main strengths and weaknesses of the methodologies. The guideline discusses some common issues in meta-analysis that must be considered when interpreting results. Finally, the guideline provides a set of recommendations regarding the use of direct and indirect comparisons in a relative effectiveness assessment (REA).

Methods papers of HTA agencies
 IQWiG: General methods (version 5.0), Institute for Quality and Efficiency in Health Care, Cologne, Germany. The IQWiG General Methods explain the legal and scientific basis of IQWiG and describe the tasks and the scientific tools applied by IQWiG in the preparation of its products. 
 NICE: Guide to the methods of technology appraisal - Process and methods [PMG9] - Published date: April 2013. National Institute for Health and Care Excellence, London, UK. The NICE Process and Methods Guide provides an overview of the principles and methods of health technology assessment and appraisal within the context of the NICE appraisal process. It describes key principles of appraisal methodology and is a guide for all organisations considering submitting evidence to the technology appraisal programme of the Institute.

References classified as country specific

See also
 Guidances for statistics in regulatory affairs
 Clinical trials
 Medical statistics
 Epidemiological method
 Epidemiology
 Medicine

References

External links 

 ICH Efficacy Guidelines
 European Medicines Agency’s (EMA) scientific guidelines on biostatistics
 FDA Regulatory Information - Guidances

Clinical trials
Medical statistics